The River Bell Classic is the annual football game between Nicholls State University and Southeastern Louisiana University with the winner being presented with the River Bell Trophy. The two schools are 94 miles apart and no two football-playing schools in the Southland Conference are as close as Nicholls and Southeastern Louisiana. The game played between the rivals began in 1972 and was played annually until 1985 when Southeastern Louisiana dropped its football program. It resumed 20 years later in 2005 when football was reinstated by the university.

The River Bell Trophy, which was redesigned for the 2012 contest, is a wooden trophy which has a ship's bell under an arch which reads "River Bell Classic". On each side of the bell are the teams' athletic logos with Nicholls on the left and Southeastern Louisiana on the right. Underneath the bell is a plaque surrounded by the yearly victors on each side of the plaque. The trophy was conceived by the Phi Chapter Alumni Association of Sigma Tau Gamma fraternity at Southeastern Louisiana.

Game results

See also
 List of NCAA college football rivalry games

References

Additional sources
 River Bell Classic
  Nicholls Colonels Media Guide

College football rivalries in the United States
Nicholls Colonels football
Southeastern Louisiana Lions football
1972 establishments in Louisiana